Stokes's sea snake (Hydrophis stokesii) is a large species of sea snake in the family Elapidae. It is sometimes placed in its own genus Astrotia. The species is endemic to tropical Indo-Pacific oceanic waters.

Etymology
Both the specific name, stokesii, and the common name, Stokes' seasnake, are in honor of Royal Navy Admiral John Lort Stokes.

Description
Stokes's sea snake is one of the heaviest and stoutest seasnakes, with the longest fangs of any marine snake. Its fangs are long enough to pierce a wetsuit. Its mid-ventral scales are enlarged to form a distinct keel on its belly, the keel frequently broken up into two wart-like tubercles. A. stokesii is highly variable in colour, ranging from cream to brown to black, often with broad black dorsal cross bands, or black rings.

Rostral as deep as broad; nasals shorter than the frontal, more than twice as long as the suture between the prefrontals; frontal longer than broad, as long as or slightly longer than its distance from the rostral scale; one pre- and two postoculars, 9 or 10 upper labials, fourth, fifth, and sixth catering the eye, if not divided to form a series of suboculars; two or three superposed anterior temporals; no chin-shields. 39 to 47 scales round the neck, 48 to 53 round the middle of the body. Ventral scales usually distinct only quite anteriorly, further back in pairs and not larger than the adjoining scales; scales much imbricate, pointed.

Total length .

Geographic range
It is distributed from Pakistan and Sri Lanka to the South China Sea and Strait of Taiwan. It also lives in all waters of tropical Australia.

Human interactions
There are no reported human fatalities attributed to Stokes's seasnake.

Stokes's sea snake is captured as bycatch in fisheries, for example in prawn fisheries in Australia.

Habits
Stokes's sea snakes sometimes form migrating groups in the thousands, drifting in meter-long slicks in the Strait of Malacca. They are ovoviviparous, producing small broods of five young each mating season.

Taxonomy
It was first described and named as Hydrus stokesii by John Edward Gray in Appendix 3 to Volume 1 of John Lort Stokes' 1846 Discoveries in Australia. In 1972, McDowell resurrected the genus Disteira and merged Astrotia into it, although stokesii lacks the Oxyuranus pattern of venom gland muscle which typifies Disteira, and differs from others in that genus by number of body vertebrae and heart position. Cogger later refused to recognize the placement of stokesii into Disteira.

References

Further reading
Boulenger, G.A. (1896). Catalogue of the Snakes in the British Museum (Natural History). Volume III., Containing the Colubridæ (Opisthoglyphæ and Proteroglyphæ) ... London: Trustees of the British Museum (Natural History). (Taylor and Francis, printers). xiv + 727 pp. + Plates I-XXV. (Distira stokesii, pp. 288–289).
Cogger, H.G. (2000). Reptiles and Amphibians of Australia, Sixth Edition. Sanibel Island, Florida: Ralph Curtis Publishing. 808 pp.
Dunson, William A.; Minton, Sherman A. (1978). "Diversity, distribution, and Ecology of Philippine Marine Snakes (Reptilia, Serpentes)". Journal of Herpetology 12 (3): 281-286.
Günther, A.C.L.G. (1864). The Reptiles of British India. London: The Ray Society. (Taylor and Francis, printers). xxvii + 452 pp. + Plates I-XXVI. (Hydrophis stokesii, p. 363).
Rasmussen, A.R. (1997). "Systematics of sea snakes: a critical review". pp. 15–30. In: Thorpe, R.S.; Wüster, W.; Malhotra, A. (editors) (1997). Venomous Snakes: Ecology, Evolution and Snakebite. Oxford: Clarendon Press / Symp. Zool. Soc. London 70. 296 pp. .
Smith, M.A. (1943). The Fauna of British India, Ceylon and Burma, Including the Whole of the Indo-Chinese Sub-region. Reptilia and Amphibia. Vol. III.—Serpentes. London: Secretary of State for India. (Taylor and Francis, printers). xii + 583 pp. ("Astrotia stokesi [sic]", pp. 471–472).
Wall, F. (1921). Ophidia Taprobanica or the Snakes of Ceylon. Colombo, Ceylon [Sri Lanka]: Colombo Museum. (H.R. Cottle, Government Printer). xxii + 581 pp. (Astrotia stokesii, pp. 396–400, Figure 75).

External links
 

Hydrophis
Monotypic snake genera
Reptiles described in 1846
Reptiles of Bangladesh
Reptiles of Cambodia
Reptiles of Iran
Reptiles of Japan
Snakes of New Caledonia
Reptiles of Pakistan
Reptiles of Papua New Guinea
Reptiles of the Philippines
Reptiles of Sri Lanka
Reptiles of Taiwan
Reptiles of Western Australia
Snakes of Australia
Snakes of China
Snakes of Indonesia
Snakes of Myanmar
Snakes of Malaysia
Snakes of New Guinea
Snakes of Thailand
Snakes of Vietnam
Taxa named by John Edward Gray